Enulius is a genus of snakes in the family Colubridae. The genus is endemic to the Americas.

Geographic range
Species in the genus Enulius are found in northern Mexico, Central America, and northwestern South America.

Species and subspecies
The following species and subspecies are recognized as being valid.
Enulius bifoveatus  - Guanaja long-tailed snake
Enulius flavitorques  - Pacific longtail snake
Enulius flavitorques flavitorques   
Enulius flavitorques sumichrasti 
Enulius flavitorques unicolor 
Enulius oligostichus  - Mexican longtail snake
Enulius roatanensis  - Roatan long-tailed snake

Nota bene: A binomial authority or trinomial authority in parentheses indicates that the species or subspecies was originally described in a genus other than Enulius.

Etymology
The subspecific name, sumichrasti, is in honor of Swiss-born Mexican naturalist Adrien Jean Louis François de Sumichrast (1828–1882).

References

Further reading
Cope ED (1870). "Eighth Contribution to the Herpetology of Tropical America". Proceedings of the American Philosophical Society 11: 553–559. (Enulius, new genus, pp. 558–559).

Enulius
Snake genera
Taxa named by Edward Drinker Cope